Sigmund S. Mandl (1898-1976) was the founder of the Husky Wrench manufacturing company. His brother Hugo was born in Úsov.

On January 29, 1924, he founded Husky Wrench in Milwaukee, Wisconsin, with two partners, at about the time he filed his first patent. After selling the business Mandl went to Blackhawk Manufacturing in 1931, and became one of their two chief design engineers. Later, he was General Manager of Die-Mold Corporation, while continuing to hold his position at Blackhawk.

Mandl received a number of patents for tool design, including:
 
 
 
 

A monument was dedicated in his memory in Milwaukee's Agudas Achim Cemetery, August 7, 1988.

References

Businesspeople from Milwaukee

Czech Jews